Highway 751 is a highway in the Canadian province of Saskatchewan. It runs from Highway 4 near Elrose to Highway 42.

See also 
Roads in Saskatchewan
Transportation in Saskatchewan

References 

751